The men's 100 metre freestyle was a swimming event held as part of the swimming at the 1920 Summer Olympics programme. It was the fourth appearance of the event. A total of 31 swimmers from 15 nations competed in the event, which was held from August 22 to August 29, 1920. Nations were limited to four swimmers each. The United States swept the medals, and Duke Kahanamoku broke his own Olympic record in the semifinals and bettered his time again in the final to successfully defend his championship from 1912. Kahanamoku was the first man to successfully defend an Olympic 100 metres freestyle title (excluding Charles Daniels's win in the 1906 Intercalated Games) and third man to win multiple medals of any color in the event (including Daniels's silver and Zoltán Halmay's gold in the 1904 yards-based event).

Background

This was the fifth appearance of the men's 100 metre freestyle. The event has been held at every Summer Olympics except 1900 (when the shortest freestyle was the 200 metres), though the 1904 version was measured in yards rather than metres.

One of the six finalists from 1912 returned: gold medalist Duke Kahanamoku of the United States. The favorites were Kahanamoku and fellow American Norman Ross, the 1919 Inter-Allied Games winner. Kahanamoku had broken the world record in 1918.

Brazil, Czechoslovakia, Japan, Luxembourg, and Switzerland each made their debut in the event; Australia made its first appearance separate from New Zealand (the two had previously competed together as Australasia). The United States made its fifth appearance, having competed at each edition of the event to date. Hungary missed the event for the first time, with the nation not invited to the Games after World War I.

Competition format

The competition used a three-round (quarterfinals, semifinals, final) format. The advancement rule was the same used in 1912; for each round before the final, the top two in each heat plus the fastest third-place swimmer would advance. There were 6 quarterfinals of between 4 and 7 swimmers, allowing 13 swimmers to advance to the semifinals. The 2 semifinals had 6 or 7 swimmers; 5 advanced to the final.

Records

These were the standing world and Olympic records (in minutes) prior to the 1920 Summer Olympics.

In the first heat Duke Kahanamoku set a new Olympic record with 1:01.8 minutes. In the semi-final he equalled the standing world record with 1:01.4 minutes. In the final which was later re-swum Kahanamoku set a new world record with 1:00.4 minutes, in the second final he equalled his record of 1:01.4 minutes again.

Schedule

Results

Heats

The fastest two in each heat and the fastest third-placed from across the heats advanced.

Heat 1

Heat 2

Heat 3

Heat 4

Heat 5

Heat 6

Semifinals

The fastest two in each semi-final and the faster of the two third-placed swimmer advanced to the final.

Semifinal 1

Semifinal 2

Final

In the first final Norman Ross finished fourth and William Herald finished fifth, but a second final was run after a protest by Herald, claiming that Ross had fouled him. For the second run Ross was disqualified. None of the medal ranks changed.

Results summary

References

Notes
 
 

Swimming at the 1920 Summer Olympics
Men's events at the 1920 Summer Olympics